Sigve Lie (April 1, 1906 – March 18, 1958) was a Norwegian sailor and Olympic champion. He competed at the 1948 Summer Olympics in London, where he received a gold medal in the dragon class as crew member on the boat Pan.

He competed at the 1952 Summer Olympics in Helsinki, where he again received a gold medal with Pan.

He died in Oslo in 1958.

References

External links

1906 births
1958 deaths
Norwegian male sailors (sport)
Olympic sailors of Norway
Sailors at the 1948 Summer Olympics – Dragon
Sailors at the 1952 Summer Olympics – Dragon
Olympic gold medalists for Norway
Olympic medalists in sailing
Medalists at the 1952 Summer Olympics
Medalists at the 1948 Summer Olympics